Japanese-style baseball, or rubber-ball baseball, is a game that was created in Japan and is derived from baseball. It uses a hard rubber ball instead of a regular baseball made of leather. It has been rendered in English in a variety of ways, including nankyu baseball (nankyu means 'soft ball' in Japanese), nanshiki baseball and rubber baseball. In a narrow sense, Japanese-style baseball is a game that uses a hollow rubber ball, and in a broad sense, it includes a semi-hard baseball where a hard ball's outer coating is replaced with rubber. In contrast, the ball used in softball is most often leather but is larger than a regular baseball.　

Other than the use of a different ball, the rules of Japanese-style baseball and regular baseball are the same. However, the difference in the ball has a distinctive effect on the playing style and equipment, and also changes the way the players use their body.

History 

During the Meiji era (1868–1912), baseball introduced from the United States became established in Japan in national competitions for secondary schools, high schools, and colleges, and children enjoyed playing baseball using hard tennis balls. However, tennis balls had the drawback of being difficult to use due to problems with their durability and speed, and the number of people playing the sport gradually declined.
In 1919, Toshin Rubber, a company based in Kobe, sold the world's first rubber baseball. As a result, the number of young people playing baseball started to increase again. Then in 1925, a man called  formed the same organization in Tokyo.

Ball types 

Two types are specified: type M (major) and type J (junior).

Global popularity 

Japanese-style baseball is often played by university teams, and there is a World University Japanese-style Baseball Tournament that takes place outside Japan. It was held in Guam in 2019. In addition, the International Boys Nankyu Baseball World Championship takes place annually.

Cuba has its own version of Japanese-style baseball, and a similar type of baseball is also played in Taiwan.

References 

Japan Rubber Baseball Association’s webpage

External links 
 Sports Nippon Newspapers article
 Tokyo Nanshiki Baseball Association's webpage

 
Japan